Marianna Raguž (born 19 September 1975) is a former Croatian female professional basketball player.

External links
Profile at fibaeurope.com
Profile at eurobasket.com

1975 births
Living people
Croatian women's basketball players
Power forwards (basketball)
ŽKK Gospić players